CC PDF Converter was a free and open-source program that allowed users to convert documents into PDF files on Microsoft Windows operating systems, while embedding a Creative Commons license.
The application leveraged RedMon and Ghostscript and was licensed under the GNU GPL.

A 2013 review in PC World gave the software 4 out of 5 stars.

CC PDF Converter included Razoss Bar (RazossInstaller_cogniview.exe), a closed source toolbar that is installed by default (tested version 0.9.0.0).

CC PDF Converter is no longer available from the original developer (Cogniview).

In 2018, the U.S. Department of Veterans Affairs designated the software as divest.  the VA designation has been unapproved.

See also 
 RedMon
 Ghostscript
 List of PDF software
 List of virtual printer software

Notes

References

Free PDF software
Windows-only free software